Below is a list of the rosters as they currently stand for the upcoming 2022–23 WNBL season.

Rosters

Adelaide Lightning

Bendigo Spirit

Canberra Capitals

Melbourne Boomers

Perth Lynx

Southside Flyers

Sydney Flames

Townsville Fire

References

External links
 WNBL official website

rosters
Women's National Basketball League lists